Türi Ganvix JK is an Estonian football club based in Türi. Founded in 2004, they currently play in the III liiga, third of Estonian football. Türi linnastaadion is their home stadium. They also have a reserve team, SK Tääksi, which plays in III Liiga.

Players

Current squad
''As of 24 August 2013.

Statistics

League and Cup

References

External links
Türi Ganvix JK at Estonian Football Association

Football clubs in Estonia
Association football clubs established in 2004
Türi Parish
2004 establishments in Estonia